The Generating Company was a touring circus company producing large shows and events around the world. Most recent shows include 'Voyage de la Vie' at Resorts World Sentosa in Singapore and 'Aqua' the world's largest water show were located in Shenzhen southern China. The company also produced events and ran training programmes for artists and young people. The company was based in London, England and Le Buisson-de-Cadouin, France.

History

Formation
The Generating Company founder, Paul Cockle, was Production Manager for the Millennium Dome Show directed by Peter Gabriel, Mark Fisher and Micha Bergese, in 1998 to create a show for the Millennium Experience, an exhibition hosted at the Millennium Dome to welcome the third millennium. The team turned to Circus Space, now the National Centre for Circus Arts, which was the first centre in the UK to offer a degree in circus arts. With little more than a year until opening night, Circus Space formed an accredited programme and trained 87 aerial performers for the Dome show.

The Dome show premiered on New Year's Eve, 1999. While the Dome itself was mired in controversy and financial woes, the show opened to critical success. With only a year-long contract at the Dome, many of the show's performers considered a return to Circus Space to continue their careers. When the show closed at the end of 2000, about 20 of the performers returned to Circus Space to form The Generating Company, a small traveling company that retained many of the characteristics of the original Dome performance.

Financing and schools
Following their success at the Dome and Circus Space, The Generating Company received a £70,000 grant from the National Endowment for Science Technology and the Arts and grants from the Arts Council England to begin a touring company. After a local show, Storm, performed at Circus Space in Hoxton, The Generating Company began pursuing a "fusion of professional training with an extended performance contract linked to future touring opportunities." It opened its first school in 2002, offering summer courses devised for children interested in circus skills. It also hosted programs at Trinity Buoy Wharf through 2009.

In 2008, The Generating Company moved the majority of its professional schooling and develop a creative centre at Le Buisson-de-Cadouin, France. Paul Cockle explained that setting up the company in France offered the chance to develop a residential centre where artists can live and work together. The Generating Company still has administration offices in London but its core operation is based in France.

Shows
Voyage de la Vie - Resorts World Sentosa, Singapore
Aqua

Dragons' Den
The Generating Company successfully appeared on the Dragons' Den in December 2005. Represented by Paul Cockle, Peter Jones and Theo Paphitis decided to invest in the company. Together they invested £160,000 into the company and own a 40% stake.

References

External links
 The Generating Company Official Website

Circuses
Entertainment companies established in 2001
2001 establishments in England